Lake Malawi is a Czech indie pop band from Třinec formed in 2013. The band currently consists of lead vocalist, guitarist and keyboardist Albert Černý, and bassist and keyboardist Jeroným Šubrt. The band was formed by Černý following the breakup of his former band Charlie Straight. Their debut extended play We Are Making Love Again was released in 2015, followed by their debut studio album Surrounded by Light in 2017. They represented the Czech Republic in the Eurovision Song Contest 2019 with the song "Friend of a Friend", finishing in 11th place.

History
Lake Malawi was founded by lead vocalist and frontman Albert Černý, following the breakup of his former band Charlie Straight in September 2013. Lake Malawi, the band's name, is inspired by the song "Calgary" by Bon Iver, from their 2011 self-titled album. They later released their debut single "Always June" in 2014, performing it live during an interview with BBC London. In 2014, Lake Malawi performed at major Czech music festivals Colours of Ostrava and Rock for People, and The Great Escape Festival in the United Kingdom. They later released their debut extended play We Are Making Love Again in 2015. They opened for several notable acts performing in Prague, including The Kooks, Mika, and Thirty Seconds to Mars. In 2016, drummer and former Charlie Straight member Pavel Palát left the band; he was replaced by Antonín Hrabal.

In 2017, they self-released their debut studio album Surrounded by Light. The album also produced two singles, the title track "Surrounded by Light" and the song "Paris" both charting on the Rádio – Top 100 in the Czech Republic. Lead guitarist Patrick Karpentski left the band in late-2017. In 2019, it was announced that they were taking part in the Czech national final for the Eurovision Song Contest 2019 with the song "Friend of a Friend". The song later won the national selection, and represented the Czech Republic in the contest. After performing sixth in the first semi-final, the band qualified for the final, where they finished in 11th place with 157 points.

Members
Albert Černý (2013–present) – vocals, guitar, keyboards
Jeroným Šubrt (2013–present) – bass, keyboards

Former
Pavel Palát (2013–16) – drums
Patrick Karpentski (2013–17) – guitar
Antonín Hrabal (2016–21) – drums

Discography

Studio albums

Extended plays

Singles

References

External links

Czech pop music groups
Musical groups established in 2013
Musical groups from Třinec
Eurovision Song Contest entrants of 2019
Eurovision Song Contest entrants for the Czech Republic
2013 establishments in the Czech Republic